The 1977–78 WHA season was the sixth season of the World Hockey Association (WHA). Eight teams played 80 games each. The Avco World Trophy winner was the Winnipeg Jets.

League business
With a reduction of three teams from the end of the previous season (the San Diego Mariners, Phoenix Roadrunners, and Calgary Cowboys folded), the WHA abandoned its divisional format and grouped the remaining eight teams together. There had been a tentative merger agreement that would have had Cincinnati, Houston, New England, Winnipeg, Quebec, and Edmonton join the NHL but it could not be finalized.

In a unique move, two international All-Star teams, the Soviet All-Stars and Czechoslovakia All-Stars, played games that counted in the regular season standings.  They played each WHA team once, on the WHA team's home ice. The Soviet team acquitted themselves well, winning three plus two additional games against WHA teams outside the regular standings, tying one and losing the other four; while the Czechoslovakian team only won once and tied once, losing six.  This is the first time International teams competed in regular season competition in a major professional sports league in North America; those two teams as well as a Finnish team would come back to play the WHA teams the next year.

The best six teams qualified for the playoffs.  However, instead of the standard schedule for a six-team playoff (i.e., giving the first and second place teams byes into the semifinals, with the third, fourth, fifth, and sixth place teams opening in the quarterfinals), the WHA came up with a unique twist.  There were three quarterfinal series instead of two, with the teams paired top to bottom (i.e., 1st vs. 6th, 2nd vs. 5th, 3rd vs. 4th).  The highest-seeded quarterfinal winner then received a semifinal bye and advanced directly to the finals, while the remaining two quarterfinal series winners played off in a single semifinal.  All series were best four-out-of-seven games.

Regular season
The Howe family of Gordie and his sons Mark and Marty moved to the New England Whalers from the Houston Aeros. The trio helped the Whalers to the Avco Cup final.

Final standings

Player stats

Scoring leaders
Bolded numbers indicate season leaders

GP = Games played; G = Goals; A = Assists; Pts = Points; PIM = Penalty minutes

Leading goaltenders 
Bolded numbers indicate season leaders

GP = Games played; Min = Minutes played; W = Wins; L = Losses; T = Ties, GA = Goals against; GA = Goals against; SO = Shutouts; SV% = Save percentage; GAA = Goals against average

All-Star Game
The 1978 WHA All-Star game pitted the defending champion Quebec Nordiques against the stars from the remaining WHA teams. The game was played on 17 January 1978, in Quebec City, and attracted 6,413 spectators.
The Nordiques, coached by Marc Boileau, won the game 5–4. Marc Tardif and Mark Howe were named the players of the game.

Playoffs

Bracket

Avco World Cup playoffs

Quarterfinals
New England Whalers 4, Edmonton Oilers 1

Quebec Nordiques 4, Houston Aeros 2

Winnipeg Jets 4, Birmingham Bulls 1

Semifinals
The top ranked quarterfinal winner (Winnipeg) received a bye into the finals.
 
New England Whalers 4, Quebec Nordiques 1

Avco Cup Finals
Winnipeg Jets 4, New England Whalers 0

WHA awards

Trophies

All-Star Team

See also
1977 WHA Amateur Draft
1977–78 NHL season

References
HockeyDB

 
2
2
World Hockey Association seasons
WHA
WHA